Além da Alienação (Portuguese for "Beyond the Alienation") is the third studio album by Brazilian new wave band João Penca e Seus Miquinhos Amestrados. It was released in 1988 by RCA Records. The album counts with a guest appearance by Virginie Boutaud of Metrô fame on the track "Sem Ilusões".

Covers/parodies

Every João Penca album features Portuguese-language covers/parodies of old 1940s/1950s rock and roll/rockabilly and 1960s surf music songs.

"A Louca do Humaitá"
A parody of Holl Ister's and Thomas Nolan's "Ring Around Your Neck".

Track listing

Personnel
João Penca e Seus Miquinhos Amestrados
 Selvagem Big Abreu (Sérgio Ricardo Abreu) — vocals, electric guitar
 Avellar Love (Luís Carlos de Avellar Júnior) — vocals, bass
 Bob Gallo (Marcelo Ferreira Knudsen) — vocals, drums

Guest musicians
 Virginie Boutaud — female vocals (on track 3)

Miscellaneous staff
 Reinaldo Barriga — production
 Miguel Plopschi — art direction

References

1988 albums
RCA Records albums
Portuguese-language albums
João Penca e Seus Miquinhos Amestrados albums